The Gräfingründer Teich, also called Grauer Teich is a reservoir near Straßberg in the German state of Saxony-Anhalt. Part of the Lower Harz Pond and Ditch System, it impounds an unnamed stream.

External links

 Gräfingründer Teich at harzlife.de (German)

Lower Harz Pond and Ditch System
Reservoirs in Saxony-Anhalt
RGrafingrunderTeich